999 Zachia is a main-belt asteroid that was discovered by German astronomer Karl W. Reinmuth in 1923 and named after Hungarian astronomer Franz Xaver von Zach.

Photometric observations of this asteroid collected during 1999 show a rotation period of 22.77 ± 0.03 hours with a brightness variation of 0.3 magnitude.

References

External links 
 Lightcurve plot of 999 Zachia, Palmer Divide Observatory, B. D. Warner (1999)
 Asteroid Lightcurve Database (LCDB), query form (info)
 Dictionary of Minor Planet Names, Google books
 Asteroids and comets rotation curves, CdR – Observatoire de Genève, Raoul Behrend
 Discovery Circumstances: Numbered Minor Planets (1)-(5000) – Minor Planet Center
 
 

000999
Discoveries by Karl Wilhelm Reinmuth
Named minor planets
19230809

vec:Lista de asteroidi#999 Zachia